The 2002 New Zealand Royal Visit Honours was an appointment by Elizabeth II to the Royal Victorian Order, to mark her visit to New Zealand in February that year as part of her golden jubilee celebrations. The only appointment, dated 22 February 2002, was of Leanne Woon, who served as equerry to the Queen during the visit.  Woon was the first woman to serve in that capacity.

The recipient is displayed here as she was styled before her new honour.

Royal Victorian Order

Member (MVO)
 Squadron Leader Leanne Woon – Royal New Zealand Air Force

References

2002 awards
Royal Visit Honours
Monarchy in New Zealand